The Roman Catholic Diocese of Tumaco is a suffragan Latin diocese in the Ecclesiastical province of Popayán, in southwestern Colombia.

Its cathedral episcopal see is the Catedral San Andrés, dedicated to Saint Andrew, in the city of Tumaco, Nariño Department.

History 
 Established on 1 May 1927 as Apostolic Prefecture of Tumaco, on territories split off from the Diocese of Cali and Diocese of Pasto
 Lost territories twice : on 1952.11.14 to establish the Apostolic Vicariate of Buenaventura and on 1954.04.05 to establish the then Apostolic Prefecture of Guapi 
 Promoted on 7 February 1961 as Apostolic Vicariate of Tumaco, hence entitled to a titular bishop
 It enjoyed a Papal visit from Pope John Paul II in July 1986.
 29 October 1999: Promoted as Diocese of Tumaco.

Statistics 
As per 2014, it pastorally served 249,520 Catholics (74.4% of 335,320 total) on 16,000 km² in 17 parishes with 31 priests (19 diocesan, 12 religious), 9 deacons, 39 lay religious (26 brothers, 13 sisters) and 7 seminarians.

Ordinaries 
(all Roman rite)

Apostolic Prefects of Tumaco 
 Bernardo Merizalde Morales, Augustianian Recollects (O.A.R.) (born Colombia) (1928.03.30 – retired 1949), died 1971
 Peitro Nel Ramirez, O.A.R. (1949.07.14 – ?)
 Luis Francisco Irizar Salazar, Discalced Carmelites (O.C.D.) (born Spain) (1954.04.23 – 1961.02.07 see below)

Apostolic Vicars of Tumaco 
 Luis Francisco Irizar Salazar, O.C.D. (see above 1961.02.07 – death 1965.11.05), Titular Bishop of Philæ (1961.02.07 – 1965.11.05)
 Miguel Angel Lecumberri Erburu, O.C.D. (born Spain) (1966.05.03 – retired 1990.02.08), Titular Bishop of Lambiridi (1966.05.03 – death 2007.03.14)
 Gustavo Girón Higuita, O.C.D. (born Colombia) (1990.02.08 – 1999.10.29 see below), Titular Bishop of Bisica (1990.02.08 – 1999.10.29)

Suffragan Bishops of Tumaco 
 Gustavo Girón Higuita, O.C.D. (see above 1999.10.29 – retired 2015.07.25)
 Orlando Olave Villanoba (born Colombia; first non-regular incumbent) (2017.03.18 – ...).

See also
 List of Catholic dioceses in Colombia
 Roman Catholicism in Colombia

References

Sources and external links 
 GCatholic.org, with Google photo - data for all sections
 www.diocesisdetumaco.org Diocesan website 

Roman Catholic dioceses in Colombia
Roman Catholic Ecclesiastical Province of Popayán
Religious organizations established in 1927
Roman Catholic dioceses and prelatures established in the 20th century